The Houston Cougars football statistical leaders are individual statistical leaders of the Houston Cougars football program in various categories, including passing, rushing, receiving, total offense, defensive stats, and kicking. Within those areas, the lists identify single-game, single-season, and career leaders. The Cougars represent the University of Houston in the NCAA Division I FBS American Athletic Conference, after which UH will join the Big 12 Conference.

Houston began competing in intercollegiate football in 1946, but these lists are dominated by more recent players for several reasons:
 Since 1946, regular seasons have increased from 10 games to 11 and then 12 games in length.
 The NCAA didn't allow freshmen to play varsity football until 1972 (with the exception of the World War II years), allowing players to have four-year careers.
 Bowl games only began counting toward single-season and career statistics in 2002. The Cougars have played in 15 bowl games since then, allowing recent players an extra game to accumulate statistics. Similarly, the Cougars played in the Conference USA Championship Game three times and the AAC Championship Game twice, so players in those seasons played 14 games.
 Houston has recently run a spread offense under coaches Art Briles, Kevin Sumlin, Tony Levine, Tom Herman, Major Applewhite, and Dana Holgorsen, allowing offensive players to accumulate many yards and touchdowns. Most notably among these is quarterback Case Keenum, who holds the records for passing yards, passing touchdowns, and total offense across all of college football.

These lists are updated through the end of the 2022 season.

Passing

Passing yards

Passing touchdowns

Rushing

Rushing yards

Rushing touchdowns

Receiving

Receptions

Receiving yards

Receiving touchdowns

Total offense
Total offense is the sum of passing and rushing statistics. It does not include receiving or returns.

Total offense yards

Touchdowns responsible for
"Touchdowns responsible for" is the NCAA's official term for combined passing and rushing touchdowns.

Defense

Interceptions

Tackles

Sacks

Kicking

Field goals made

Field goal percentage

References

Houston